Embedded RDF (eRDF) is a syntax for writing HTML in such a way that the information in the HTML document can be extracted (with an eRDF parser or XSLT style sheet) into Resource Description Framework (RDF). This can be of great use for searching within data.

It was invented by Ian Davis in 2005, and partly inspired by microformats, a simplified approach to semantically annotate data in websites. This specification is obsolete, superseded by RDFa, Microdata, and JSON-LD.

See also
 RDFa, W3C's approach at embedding RDF within HTML
 JSON-LD, W3C's approach at embedding RDF within HTML in the form of JSON snippets
 GRDDL, a way to extract (annotated) data out of XHTML and XML documents and transform it into an RDF graph
 Microdata (HTML), another approach at embedding semantics in HTML using additional attributes.
 microformats, the most common way of embedding additional semantics in HTML.

References

External links
 Project at GitHub
 Resource Description Framework Wiki at W3.org

XML-based standards
Metadata publishing
Semantic Web